Larkhall is a ward in the London Borough of Lambeth, represented locally by Labour councillors Andy Wilson, Tina Valcarcel and Tim Windle. Prior to her entry to Parliament, it was represented by Marsha de Cordova MP. It is one of eight wards in the Vauxhall constituency represented at national level by Florence Eshalomi MP.

Ward profile 
Larkhall is sandwiched between Clapham and Stockwell and most residents perceive themselves to be living in either Clapham or Stockwell. Three main roads run through the ward from north to south - Landor Road in the east, Clapham Road in the centre, and Wandsworth Road in the west. The ward is named Larkhall because Larkhall Rise, then Larkhall Lane runs through the middle of it.

Larkhall contains four schools: Larkhall Infants and Junior School, St Andrew's School, Lansdowne School and Griffin primary school. There is a police station on the corner of Union Grove and Smedley Street, and Lambeth Hospital is on Landor Road.

The main Lambeth Housing estates are Fenwick, Springfield, Larkhall, Clapham Road, Patmore and Gaskell Street. Stockwell Gardens and the three imposing towers of Grantham Road are run by Hyde Southbank housing association.

Population
The 2001 Census showed that Larkhall has a population of approximately 14,000 people, with 10,000 registered electors. A large proportion of its population was born outside of the EU. There are a large proportion of young adults aged between 16 and 24, with a high level of economic activity. Larkhall has a high rate of people aged 0–15 with long-term limiting illness. Larkhall has a high proportion of older people not living alone, and not in a couple. There was a large increase in private renting between 1991 and 2001.

Lambeth Council elections

 

 -->

References

External links
Larkhall ward census data
Larkhall ward election results on Lambeth website

Wards of the London Borough of Lambeth